Bakhtar UniversityBakhtar University (BU) is one of Afghanistan's oldest and most prestigious privately held universities. It was Established in 2005 from a small beginning at Kabul Polytechnic University; through its current location at Kart-e-Char. Bakhtar University is now recognized as an integral part of Afghanistan's growing economic, political and social circumstances. As an independent Afghanistan institution of higher education, BU, as the first established privately held institution, has been recognized with excellent and high-quality programs comparable to its international affiliates such as Indira Gandhi National Open University, India, American International College USA, Georgetown University USA, Attaturk University, Turkey, University of Putra Malaysia (UPM).BU has a commitment to the next generation of business, technology, political and cultural leaders in the modernization of Afghanistan. It is a pioneer in providing quality education in finance, accounting management, and introducing master's degree programs (MBA & MCS) for the first time in Afghanistan and is a pioneer in providing a permanent mechanism for obtaining higher academic & professional qualifications in Afghanistan. During its short existence, the University has made a significant impact in higher education by reaching out to a large section of the population with a range of diverse and relevant programs that are of high quality and affordable. Since its inception, the University has attracted approximately over 5000 students in various disciplines and enjoy a quality academic experience BU offers a variety of specialist Undergraduate and Postgraduate in Business, Finance, Information Technology, Law, Journalism, and Engineering, which are directly linked to Afghanistan's human resource needs. All (BU) degree programs are accredited by the Ministry of Higher Education Afghanistan, International Accreditation Council for Business Education (IACBE) of the United States and are also audited by the QS Starts. The internationally recognized qualifications enable Bakhtar graduates to pursue rewarding careers in Afghanistan's burgeoning employment market. Because of the high-quality teaching program, BU students are currently placed in prominent positions in both the public and private sectors across the region. BU's Center for Language & Culture offers language courses in English. They range from English language study for University preparation. BU faculty is a mix of locally and internationally recruited academics with extensive teaching, business, and industry experience. They bring years of knowledge gained from research in their respective fields into the classroom, providing students with a stimulating academic environment.

Classes are small in number, allowing the lecturers to cater to the students' individual needs. BU maintains a long and proud tradition of excellence in education combined with liberal values of inquiry strives to provide a fertile environment for bright young minds to flourish, where critical thinking is both encouraged and nurtured - qualities that characterize excellent institutes of learning. We have very close links to the community. The staff and the administration work very closely to promote high-quality education. You will find that the years you spend at Bakhtar University will be amongst the most productive, challenging, and exciting years of your life.

..

The university, for the first time in the history of Afghanistan, launched Masters programs in Business Administration and Computer Science. The university has well-qualified faculty hired mostly from Pakistan and India. Currently, the university offers MBA, MCS, BBA, BCS, BJR, BCE and LAW, and some diploma programs in the English language.

See also 
List of universities in Afghanistan

References

External links
 www.bakhtar.edu.af

Universities and colleges in Kabul
Private universities in Afghanistan
Educational institutions established in 2005
2005 establishments in Afghanistan